Babban Khala Ki Betiyan is a 2018 Pakistani drama serial that premiered on 21 June 2018 on ARY Digital. It is directed by Syed Atif Hussain and written by Mansoor Ahmed Khan. It stars Zaheen Tahira, Qavi Khan, Saima Noor, Sana Fakhar, Javeria Abbasi, and Maria Wasti. The serial is produced by Fahad Mustafa and Dr.Ali Kazmi under their banner Big Bang Entertainment. The show is the longest running Pakistani weekly series; beating Alif Allah Aur Insaan on Hum TV. The show ended on 8 June 2019 with 48 episodes; creating a record for Pakistani television.

Cast
Zaheen Tahira as Babban khala
Qavi Khan as Basharat 
Saima Noor as Ishrat (Dead)
Sana Fakhar as Durdana aka Dolly
Javeria Abbasi as Musarat aka Mommi
Maria Wasti as Habiba aka Billo 
Faryal Mehmood as Bisma aka Baby (Dead)
Farah Nadir as Asad's stepmother	
Srha Asghar as Bubbly
Sameena Nazir as Najma Aunty 
Ghazala Butt as Ruqaiya Phupo 
Tariq Jameel as Munawwar Phupa 
Shamil Khan as Qaiser (Dead)
Hassan Ahmed as Asad
Ali Josh as Munna 
Maira Khan as Munna's Second Wife
Arslan Faisal as Pappu
Faizan Shaikh as Guddu

Awards and nominations

References

External links 
 

Pakistani drama television series
2018 Pakistani television series debuts
2019 Pakistani television series endings
Urdu-language television shows
ARY Digital original programming